A badatz ( plural ) is a major Jewish beth din (rabbinical court).

In Israel, the term Badatz is often used to refer to the Badatz of the Edah HaChareidis; however, it is not the title of this group, and other batei din use the title as well. It is often used in the context of hechsherim (kashrut certification).

Rabbinical courts that use this title include:
Badatz Edah HaChareidis from Jerusalem
Badatz Igud Rabbonim of Rabbi Osher Yaakov Westheim
Badatz Chassam Sofer from Bnei Brak, and Rabbis Shmuel Eliezer Stern and Yitzchok Shlomo Ungar
Badatz Mehadrin of Rabbi Simcha HaKohen Kook and Rabbi Avraham Rubin
Badatz Machzikei HaDas of Belz
Badatz Beit Yosef of Rabbi Ovadia Yosef
Badatz Agudas Yisroel
Badatz Yoreh Deah of Rabbis Shlomo Machpoud and Ovadia Yosef
Badatz Chug Chassam Sofer of Rabbi A. Wosner
Badatz of the Hisachdus Kehilas Hayereim
Badatz of Toronto of Rabbi Amram Assayag
Badatz Rabbinical Court, based in Lakewood, New Jersey, with courtrooms around the U.S.
Badatz Mekor Haim, based in Queens, New York, of Rabbi Eliyahu Ben Haim

References

Kosher food certification organizations
Rabbinical organizations
Hebrew words and phrases in Jewish law